Franklin Square Historic District may refer to:

Franklin Square Historic District (Bloomington, Illinois), listed on the NRHP in Illinois
Franklin Square Historic District (Baltimore, Maryland), listed on the NRHP in Maryland
Franklin Square Historic District (Oswego, New York), listed on the NRHP in New York
Franklin Square Historic District, now included in West Side Historic District (Saratoga Springs, New York), listed on the NRHP in New York

See also
Franklin Square (disambiguation)
Franklin Historic District (disambiguation)